Non lasciamoci più is an Italian comedy television series.

Cast
Fabrizio Frizzi: Lawyer Paolo Bonelli
Debora Caprioglio: Laura Bini
Paolo Ferrari: Paolo's Father
Isa Barzizza: Paolo's Mother
Pino Caruso: Laura's Father
Sandro Ghiani: Mr. Pedretti
Angelo Orlando: Enea 
Gegia: Carmelina

See also
List of Italian television series

External links
 

Italian television series
Italian legal television series
1999 Italian television series debuts
2001 Italian television series endings
RAI original programming